The 1989 California Golden Bears football team was an American football team that represented the University of California, Berkeley in the Pacific-10 Conference (Pac-10) during the 1989 NCAA Division I-A football season. In their third year under head coach Bruce Snyder, the Golden Bears compiled a 4–7 record (2–6 against Pac-10 opponents), finished in last place in the Pac-10, and were outscored by their opponents by a combined total of 288 to 200.

The team's statistical leaders included Troy Taylor with 2,738 passing yards, Anthony Wallace with 560 rushing yards, and Brian Treggs with 746 receiving yards.

Schedule

Personnel

Season summary

at Oregon

at Miami (FL)

Wisconsin

at UCLA

San Jose State

USC

Washington

Oregon State

Arizona

Washington State

at Stanford

References

California
California Golden Bears football seasons
California Golden Bears football